Frederic Ewing Fox (August 19, 1917 – February 20, 1981) is known as the only man to hold the title “Keeper of Princetoniana" at Princeton University, and also served as a Special Assistant in the White House, and as Staff Assistant to President Dwight D. Eisenhower.

He was born in Stamford, Connecticut, attended schools in Scarsdale, New York and Asheville, North Carolina, and received his degree from Princeton University in 1939. In 1941 he enlisted in the U.S. Army and served in the European Theater of Operations under General Dwight D. Eisenhower as a captain in the Signal Corps until 1945.  After being honorably discharged he attended the Union Theological Seminary and Defiance College.  He went on to become pastor of four Congregational Churches in Arizona, New York, Ohio and Massachusetts.

He was brought to the attention of President Eisenhower through his articles in The New York Times on American community life.  In 1956 he became a Special Assistant in the White House; and from 1957 to January 1961 he served as Staff Assistant to the President.  In 1964 he became the Recording Secretary at Princeton University and served in that position until 1981.

References

External links
 Papers and Records of Frederic E. Fox, Dwight D. Eisenhower Presidential Library 

1917 births
Princeton University alumni
People from Scarsdale, New York
1981 deaths